Evilspeak is a 1981 American horror film directed by Eric Weston and co-written by Weston and Joseph Garofalo. The film stars Clint Howard as an outcast cadet named Stanley Coopersmith, who frequently gets tormented by his mates and advisers at a military academy. Upon finding a book of black mass that belonged to the evil medieval Father Esteban, he taps through a computer to conjure Satan and summons spells and demons to get revenge upon his harassers.

The movie was one of the infamous "video nasties" banned in the United Kingdom in the 1980s.

Plot 

During the Dark Ages, Satanic leader Father Lorenzo Esteban and his followers are approached by a church official on the shore of Spain, telling them that they are banished from Spain and denied God's grace unless they renounce Satan and their evil ways.

In the present, Stanley Coopersmith is a young cadet at West Andover military academy. He remains as a social outcast who is bullied by some of his classmates due to him being an orphan and treated unfairly by his instructors who believe him to be inept at everything. When he is punished for no clear reason by cleaning the church cellar, he finds a room belonging to Father Esteban which contains books of black magic along with Esteban's diary. He then uses his computer skills to translate the book from Latin into English. The translation describes Estaban as a Satanist and the book contains rituals for performing the Black Mass along with a promise by Esteban citing "I Will Return".

Waking up late the next morning, Stanley finds his alarm clock unplugged and his clothing tied in knots, courtesy of his belligerent classmates. This causes him to be tardy for morning classes, and his teacher writes him a punishment note to be taken to the school's Colonel headmaster Kincaid's office. He is sent to the office, where he accidentally leaves the diary on the desk of the school secretary who hides it. While Stanley is being made to clean the stables as punishment for no reason, the office secretary begins to finger the jewels on the front of the diary. Trying to pry the jewels out of their settings causes the pigs in the stable to attack Stanley.

Stanley returns to his dormitory room to find his belongings scattered again, and cannot find his book of black magic. He assumes that his classmates stole it, and he confronts them about the supposed theft at a local roller rink, but they deny knowledge of the book and he leaves. Stanley then goes to the school's computer lab to perform more general research on Satanism, even though his book is still missing. His allotted time in the lab runs out, and he is forced to leave with his research incomplete.

Stanley appears in the church cellar with computer equipment, which is assumed to be stolen from the school's computer lab. He sets up the computer and runs some inquiries into the requirements for a black mass. Searching through various bottles in the cellar left by Father Estaban, he attempts to initiate a mass but the computer informs him that he is still missing crucial ingredients, namely blood and a consecrated host. He is nearly discovered by Reverend Jameson, the church's current pastor, who sends him off to the mess hall to eat dinner. After arriving at the mess hall too late for lunch, he befriends the school's good-natured cook who makes a meal for him and shows him a litter of puppies that his dog just had. Stanley takes the smallest pup for himself, names him Fred and hides him in the church cellar.

Stanley steals the host from the church and then notices Esteban's portrait on the wall. Using the translation he attempts the ritual and is suddenly attacked by his classmates wearing masks and robes. After knocking him unconscious, they leave. Thinking he has successfully performed the ritual, Stanley is told by his computer that the ritual was incomplete and a pentagram appears on the computer screen. Stanley accidentally wakes the drunken caretaker, Sarge, who accuses him of being a thief for stealing a crowbar. Sarge attacks Stanley, who screams for help. The computer flares to life with a red pentagram on it. An unseen force then takes Sarge's head and turns it completely around, breaking his neck. Stanley discovers a catacomb filled with decapitated skeletal remains and the crypt of Father Estaban. After hiding Sarge's body, he leaves.

The school's secretary attempts one last time to pry the pentagram from the black magic book she stole from Stanley. She fails, injuring her finger which bleeds. She undresses, begins to take a shower and is fatally attacked by demonically spawned boars. After watching a beauty pageant at the school's pep rally, Stanley is attacked by his classmates who tell him that if tries to play in the big game tomorrow they'll find and kill Fred. After witnessing his beating at the hands of his classmates, the hostile and unfriendly school principal Kincaid kicks Stanley off the soccer team instead of punishing the bullies.

After a night of drinking, Stanley's classmates make their way into Esteban's hidden room and find his computer program. After killing Fred, the computer says that the blood used must be human blood. After finding Fred's mutilated body, Stanley becomes enraged. The diary appears laying on Esteban's casket. When a teacher catches Stanley in the church stealing the host, he follows him to the catacombs where he is translating the rest of the diary. Stanley pledges his life to Satan, then kills his teacher on a spiked wheel and collects his blood.

Unaware of the ritual being performed, Stanley's classmates, the coach, Kincaid, and Jameson are all in attendance at a service. After successfully performing the ritual, Esteban's soul then possesses Stanley's body and takes up a sword. Meanwhile, a nail from the large crucifix hanging over the church's altar is pried out by an unseen force and flies across the room and is driven into Jameson's skull. Stanley then rises from the cellar below engulfed in flames and wielding a sword. A pack of large black boars pours out of the hole in the floor, where Stanley now hovers above everyone else. He then decapitates Kincaid and his coach. His classmates try to flee from the church only to be devoured by the boars. In the catacombs, Bubba, the lead bully, tries to escape only to have the caretaker come back to life and kill him by ripping out his heart. The church burns to the ground.

The epilogue text states that Stanley survived the attack, but after witnessing the fiery death of his classmates, he went catatonic from shock and was sentenced to Sunnydale Asylum where he remains. Stanley's true fate is revealed, as his face appears on the computer screen in the cellar with the words "By the four beasts before the throne. By the fire which is about the throne. By the most holy and glorious name, Satan. I, Stanley Coopersmith will return. I WILL RETURN".

Cast 
 Clint Howard as Stanley Coopersmith
 R. G. Armstrong as Sarge
 Joseph Cortese as Reverend Jameson
 Claude Earl Jones as Coach
 Haywood Nelson as Kowalski
 Don Stark as Bubba Caldwell
 Charles Tyner as Colonel Kincaid
 Hamilton Camp as Hauptman
 Louie Gravance as Jo Jo
 Jim Greenleaf as Ox
 Lynn Hancock as Miss Friedemeyer
 Loren Lester as Charlie Boy
 Lenny Montana as Jake
 Leonard D'John as Tony
 Richard Moll as Father Lorenzo Estaban

Production 
The film was shot in three weeks, using locations in Santa Barbara at what is now Garden Street Academy and a condemned church in South Central Los Angeles. According to DVD commentary, the dilapidated church was superficially renovated for the movie shoot, confusing a priest who previously worked there and causing him to get on his knees and pray to God. The church was burned to the ground some three days later.

Release and controversy 
Evilspeak was released on August 22, 1981 in Japan, and February 26, 1982 in the United States.

The movie was cited as a video nasty in the UK following its release on the Videospace label. It remained banned for a number of years as part of the Video Recordings Act 1984, thanks to its gory climax and themes of Satanism.

The film was reclassified and re-released in 1987 but with over three minutes of cuts, which included the removal of most of the gore from the climax and all text images of the Black Mass on the computer screen. It was then subsequently passed uncut by the BBFC in 2004 and is now available in both an uncut form and a version re-edited by the distributors to tighten up the dialogue.

Anton LaVey, the late founder and High priest of the Church of Satan, was a great fan of the film and considered it to be very Satanic.

Actor Clint Howard said that director Eric Weston's original version of the film that was submitted to the MPAA was longer and contained more blood, gore and nudity than the unrated version of the film, especially during the shower/pig attack scene and the final confrontation. In a July 2017 interview for Gilbert Gottfried's Amazing Colossal Podcast, Howard also revealed that the film's producers made him pay for his own toupée.

Critical reception 
AllMovie called it "essentially a gender-bent rip-off of Carrie", though "there is enough in the way of spooky atmosphere and well-staged shocks to keep less discriminating horror fans interested." PopMatters gave the film a 7/10 grade, despite writing "What started as a standard wish fulfillment/revenge scheme mixed with Satanism flounders with a lack of focus." DVD Verdict wrote "Evilspeak is a crazy movie. Like, crazy. In a good way. Unfortunately, it's also kind of boring at times, taking well over an hour to get where it's going. [...] Despite the slower spots—and there are plenty of slower spots—Evilspeak remains an enjoyably overlooked horror film just for its eccentricities."

A slightly more favourable review came from TV Guide, who wrote "The directorial debut of Eric Weston, Evilspeak is remarkably engaging, imaginative and well-crafted. It contains a strong performance from Howard, plus a deliciously over-the-top nasty turn by veteran character actor R.G. Armstrong."

References

External links 
 
 
 

1981 films
1981 horror films
1980s English-language films
American films about revenge
American supernatural horror films
Films about Satanism
Films about bullying
Demons in film
Films about spirit possession
Video nasties
American splatter films
Films directed by Eric Weston
1980s American films